Falko Weißpflog (born 1954) is an East German former ski jumper who competed from 1977 to 1980.

Career
He won a bronze medal in the individual large hill competition at the 1978 FIS Nordic World Ski Championships in Lahti. 

On 5 March 1974, he set the ski jumping world record distance at 174 metres (571 ft) on Heini-Klopfer-Skiflugschanze hill in Oberstdorf, West Germany.

Weißpflog's best non-world championship career finish was fourth on three separate occasions, twice in 1978 and once in 1980. Rock singer Falco took his stage name from Weißpflog.

Ski jumping world record

References

External links

German male ski jumpers
1954 births
People from Limbach-Oberfrohna
Sportspeople from Saxony
Living people
FIS Nordic World Ski Championships medalists in ski jumping